Rusich Podolsk is an ice hockey team in Podolsk, Russia. They play in the Pervaya Liga, the third level of Russian ice hockey.
The club was founded in 2009.

See also
HC Rys

External links
Official site

Ice hockey teams in Russia